Agra railway division is one of the three railway divisions under North Central Railway zone of Indian Railways. This railway division was formed on 1 April 2003 and its headquarter is located at Agra in the state of Uttar Pradesh of India.

Allahabad railway division and Jhansi railway division are the other two railway divisions under NCR Zone headquartered at Allahabad.

Gatimaan Express, which is the fastest train in India also run across the Agra division.

List of railway stations and towns 
The list includes the stations under the Agra railway division and their station category.

Stations closed for Passengers -

See also
Express trains in India
Bhopal Shatabdi
Agra
North Central Railway

References

 

2003 establishments in Uttar Pradesh
Divisions of Indian Railways